Isabella Fitzgerald (born December 9, 1949) is an American politician who has served in the Pennsylvania House of Representatives from the 203rd district since 2017.

She was defeated in the primary election in 2022.

References

1949 births
Living people
Democratic Party members of the Pennsylvania House of Representatives
Women state legislators in Pennsylvania
21st-century American politicians
21st-century American women politicians